Norris is a village in Fulton County, Illinois, United States. The population was 213 at the 2010 census, up from 194 at the 2000 census.

Geography
Norris is located in northeastern Fulton County at  (40.625521, -90.031517). Illinois Route 78 passes through the southeast corner of the village, leading south  to Canton, the largest city in Fulton County, and north  to Farmington.

Demographics

At the 2000 census there were 194 people, 85 households, and 58 families in the village. All of the residents of the village are White.
The age distribution was 19.6% under the age of 18, 9.3% from 18 to 24, 27.8% from 25 to 44, 27.3% from 45 to 64, and 16.0% 65 or older. The median age was 41 years. For every 100 females, there were 92.1 males. For every 100 females age 18 and over, there were 92.6 males.

The median household income was $27,000 and the median family income  was $30,000. Males had a median income of $22,188 versus $18,125 for females. The per capita income for the village was $16,205. 4.6% of the population and 5.9% of families were below the poverty line. Out of the total population, no-one under the age of 18 and 4.9% of those 65 and older were living below the poverty line.

Notable person

 E.B. Harris, president of the Chicago Mercantile Exchange (1953-1978)

References

Villages in Fulton County, Illinois
Villages in Illinois